Mark Bucci (26 February 1924, New York City – 22 August 2002, Camp Verde, Arizona) was an American composer, lyricist, and dramatist. Influenced by Giacomo Puccini, his work is composed in a contemporary yet lyrical style, which frequently employs marked rhythms and memorable harmonies and melodies.

Early life and education
Born in Manhattan, Bucci was of Sicilian and Scottish ancestry. He studied music composition with Tibor Serly in New York City from 1942 to 1945 and then at the Juilliard School with Frederick Jacobi and Vittorio Giannini. At Juilliard he was notably the first winner of the school's Irving Berlin scholarship award in 1948 which was made possible through a donation by Rodgers and Hammerstein. Bucci also studied composition under Aaron Copland at the Tanglewood Music Center during the summers.

Career
Bucci's first professional composition was written for the ABC television program The Motorola Television Hour for an adaptation of James Thurber's  The 13 Clocks in 1953. The production starred Basil Rathbone as the evil Duke and garnered a considerable amount of national attention. Commissions for musical revues and operas followed, including the opera Tale for a Deaf Ear which premiered at the Tanglewood Music Festival in August 1957 and was later mounted at the New York City Opera in 1958. His opera The Hero, commissioned by the Lincoln Center Fund and first broadcast from New York in 1965, won the Italia Prize in 1966. Bucci also wrote music for two Broadway musical revues, Vintage '60 (1960) and New Faces of 1962 (1962), and several film scores including Seven in Darkness (1969), My Friends Need Killing (1976) and Human Experiments (1979). He is also the author of a handful of plays.

Accolades
He was awarded Guggenheim Fellowships in 1953 and 1957.

Personal life
He had one son, Jonathan Phillips Bucci, with his wife theatre publicist and playwright Peggy Phillips Bucci.

References

External links 
 
 

1924 births
2002 deaths
20th-century classical composers
20th-century American dramatists and playwrights
American lyricists
American male classical composers
American classical composers
American musical theatre composers
American opera composers
Male opera composers
American television composers
American writers of Italian descent
American people of Scottish descent
Juilliard School alumni
Musicians from New York City
People from Manhattan
Songwriters from New York (state)
20th-century American composers
20th-century American male musicians
American male songwriters